The twenty-second series of the British medical drama television series Holby City began on BBC One on 7 January 2020 in the United Kingdom. The series consists of 44 episodes. Jane Wallbank is the series producer, and Simon Harper is the executive producer. The series features an episode dedicated to Holocaust Memorial Day, a topical last-minute insert about the COVID-19 pandemic and a COVID-19-themed episode. Production for the drama was suspended between March and July 2020 due to the pandemic, which led to two transmission hiatuses during the series. Fifteen regular cast members reprised their roles from the previous series, four of which depart during the series, including long-serving cast members Hugh Quarshie (Ric Griffin) and Rosie Marcel (Jac Naylor). Guy Self (John Michie) returns for a short stint and Raf di Lucca (Joe McFadden) appears in a single episode, having been previously killed-off. The series also features the introduction of the show's first regular transgender character, Louis McGerry (Tyler Luke Cunningham), and a guest appearance for actor and television personality John Barrowman as Drew Nicholson-Heath.

Episodes

Production 
The series commenced on 7 January 2020 on BBC One and normally airs on Tuesday nights, although episodes 9 and 37 were originally broadcast on a Wednesday evening. Episode 11 was postponed by a week due to an extended news bulletin on the COVID-19 outbreak. Simon Harper continues his role as the executive producer of the show, until episode 32. Jane Wallbank serves as the series producer for the series. Kate Oates, the head of continuing drama at BBC Studios, and Deborah Sathe, the senior head of content production at BBC Studios, both oversee the production of the series. The series consists of 44 episodes. A winter trailer for the show's upcoming storylines was released on 4 December 2019. This series includes an episode dedicated to Holocaust Memorial Day featuring the characters of Sacha and Essie. Producers were asked by the BBC to create an episode for the occasion and they scripted it in August. The episode was broadcast as the fourth episode in the series. Holby City producers created two topical inserts for episodes 10 and 11 in March 2020, referencing the COVID-19 outbreak. A show spokesperson confirmed that the scenes were specially filmed a week prior to broadcast rather than the typical filming schedule months in advance.

The drama's upcoming storylines were previewed in a trailer released on 6 March 2020. Stories include cancer diagnoses for Essie and Fletch. Harper praised the "heartbreaking" and "wonderful" performances of Wragg and Walkinshaw, and explained that the story would follow the pair "[having] this huge, bonding thing in common but such a different experience of it." Wragg also commented on the plot, "Throughout their journeys, Essie and Fletch discover their worst fears, their lost opportunities and what futures they need to make plans for."

It was announced on 18 March 2020 that production had been suspended on Holby City and other BBC Studios continuing dramas in light of new government guidelines following the COVID-19 pandemic. A BBC Studios statement confirmed that there would be no impact on the immediate broadcast of episodes, but the "long-term ramifications are still unclear". Despite this, it was announced on 9 April 2020 that the drama would be going on an extended hiatus on 14 April, following the broadcast of episode 14. Following its broadcast, it was confirmed that the show would return in July 2020. However, on 19 May 2020, it was announced that Holby City would return to broadcast on 2 June 2020. To aid hospitals during the outbreak, Holby City donated their on-set ventilators, which are fully operational, to the NHS Nightingale Hospital. On the donation, Harper commented, "We are only too happy to help out and do what we can for the courageous and selfless real life medics." They also donated personal protective equipment and other hospital equipment to the NHS. Oates confirmed that they would not ask for them back when they resumed filming.

A second extended hiatus for Holby City was announced in August 2020 due to the show running out of episodes filmed before the suspension of production. The show breaks on 11 August, following the broadcast of episode 25. Production resumed on Holby City on 27 July 2020. Oates expressed her delight at welcoming back the "exceptional cast and crew". She added, "We have some gripping stories to tell as we explore how the lives of our characters have been irrevocably changed since the start of the pandemic - and how our heroes battle against the odds, come what may." Strict protocols were enforced to maintain the safety of the cast and crew. Additionally, the physical distancing measures enforced by the British government were adhered to. Since the drama is set in a hospital, characters used PPE as part of their costume. To avoid using NHS resources, Holby City sourced their PPE from an alternative supplier and despite this, it maintains effectiveness, allowing them to occasionally breach the physical distancing measures. Due to the protocols enforced, cast were required to apply their own makeup with verbal support from the makeup artists. The show regularly uses makeup-created injuries, such as cuts and bruises, but this was stopped due to the new protection measures. Despite this, larger makeup injuries, such as surgery closeups, were still able to be replicated using prosthetics. Jo Martin, who portrays Max McGerry, explained that more mannequin dummies were being used on-set to reduce the number of additional people required.

Producers made the pandemic a recurring theme throughout the rest of the series, and to accommodate this, all pre-existing scripts were scrapped and the pre-planned stories were rewritten. Oates explained that the decision was taken as the previous material "[would not] have felt relevant". Oates entered discussions with Tim Davie, the Director-General of the BBC, about how political Holby City could be about the pandemic, as it is one of his concerns; he permitted in-character political statements. Oates was pleased with this as she did not believe the show could be "truthful" without that and also feared it could make the show "boring". She wanted the show to reflect new landscape of the NHS and hoped that it would spark new topical conversations. She commented, "Hopefully, on shows like ours, we can make those social points at the same time as our heroes are seen in their best Avengers style embracing the same kind of life-or-death situations they always have."

In October 2020, it was confirmed that the show would resume broadcast on 10 November. Episodes were temporarily reduced to 40 minutes in length. A 20-second trailer advertising the show's return was released on 29 October 2020. Oates expressed her delight at the show's return and wanted to reflect the importance of the NHS in the drama. She also teased "stories of love, loss and betrayal" upon the drama's return. The first episode after the break explores the pandemic and focuses on how the hospital staff, led by Max, cope. David Brown, writing for The Guardian, described the episode as "a stark, uncompromising episode of Holby City, set at the peak of the first Covid spike". He believed that the show was able to reflect "the unsettling world in which we are now living", providing "an emergency service". A scene in the episode features Max informing the staff that they will have to use out-of-date PPE. Martin struggled to film the scene, but wanted to reflect the real-life situation. She commented, "What we're showing is the sheer exhaustion of the staff and their feelings of being left out there on their own. It was a complete debacle." Martin noted that the episode would express political views, but explained that it should be expected in such a "hard-hitting" episode.

Cast 
The series began with 15 roles receiving star billing. Jo Martin portrays Max McGerry, a consultant in neurosurgery and the acting chief executive officer of Holby City Hospital, the show's setting. Hugh Quarshie stars as Ric Griffin, the hospital's medical director and a consultant general surgeon on the Acute Assessment Unit (AAU). Alex Walkinshaw stars as Adrian "Fletch" Fletcher, the director of nursing services. Catherine Russell plays Serena Campbell, the clinical lead of the AAU and a consultant general surgeon. Marcus Griffiths acts as Xavier "Zav" Duval, a general surgical registrar on the unit, and Nic Jackman features as Cameron Dunn, a general surgical CT1 doctor. Jaye Jacobs appears as Donna Jackson, the unit's senior staff nurse. Bob Barrett continues his role as Sacha Levy, a consultant general surgeon and the clinical lead of the general surgery ward, Keller. David Ames portrays Dominic Copeland, Keller ward's general surgical registrar. Kaye Wragg plays staff nurse Essie Di Lucca on the ward. Dawn Steele features as Ange Godard, a consultant general surgeon and the clinical lead of the Young Adult Unit (YAU), who later becomes the clinical lead of the AAU. Ramin Karimloo appears as Kian Madani, a consultant cardiothoracic surgeon and the clinical lead of the cardiothoracic surgery ward, Darwin. Rosie Marcel features in the series as Jac Naylor, a consultant cardiothoracic surgeon, and later, the co-clinical lead of the ward. Amy Lennox stars as Chloe Godard, a cardiothoracic registrar. Belinda Owusu portrays Nicky McKendrick, a cardiothoracic CT1 doctor. Additionally, the semi-regular cast contains Jules Robertson, Darcey Burke, Julia Deakin and Charlie Condou who star as porter Jason Haynes, Jac's daughter Emma Naylor-Maconie, Dominic's adoptive mother Carole Copeland, and locum consultant general surgeon Ben Sherwood, respectively.

Russell's departure from the drama after seven years was confirmed on 30 October 2019, and Serena's exit airs at the beginning of the series. Harper expressed his sadness at the departure, but wished the actress the best for the future and thanked her for her "unique, drily witty and passionate" performance as Serena. The character departs in episode 3. Condou's guest stint as Ben ends in episode 11 at the conclusion of his coming out story. Condou explained that Ben leaves after deciding to "spend a bit of time trying to figure out who he is." Writers opted to kill-off Zav in episode 14 as part of a story creating Cameron as a villainous character. Griffiths was pleased with his "memorable" exit story and thought it formed a "wicked, really awesome arc" to his character. Wragg's departure was confirmed in July 2020, and the character is killed-off in episode 25. In the narrative, Essie dies on her way to her wedding to Sacha. On 29 October 2020, it was announced that Quarshie, the longest-serving cast member, had opted to leave the show. He praised Holby City for changing his career and commented, "I wouldn't have stayed so long if it hadn't been a great place to work, and leaving will be like leaving home - a place where there is warmth and a welcome". Ric departs in episode 26. In January 2021, the departure of Marcel was announced, ending a fifteen-year stint on the show. The actress opted to leave to spend more time with her family. Jac departs in episode 36 after being involved in a shooting and deciding to start afresh. Marcel noted similarities between her reasons for leaving and the character's.

Guy Henry returns to his role as Henrik Hanssen, a consultant general surgeon, during this series, having taken a break in the previous series. Henry confirmed that he had returned for a longer stint and Hanssen returns in the seventh episode as part of a story involving Carole. The return of actor John Michie in the role of consultant neurosurgeon Guy Self was announced on 6 March 2020. Guy returns following the privatisation of Darwin ward by external company Kestrel, which Guy has shares in. Harper expressed his delight at the character's return, promising that he would "sow trouble and strife" and create tension with Ric. The character returns in episode 13. On 9 July 2020, it was announced that Joe McFadden had reprised his role as Raf di Lucca for a single episode. The character was killed-off in a nineteenth series episode and appears as a vision to Essie during her terminal cancer story. McFadden explained that Raf returns to guide Essie in a "touching" episode. A show spokesperson told the Daily Mirror that the appearance would be "emotional" and "incredibly moving". Episode 26 features the semi-regular return of Alex Duval, the brother of Xavier, who joins the hospital as a healthcare assistant. The character previously appeared in two episodes of series 20, portrayed by Leemore Marrett Jr; upon his return, the role was recast to actor Miles Mitchell. Oates revealed on 29 October 2020 that a former character would be returning to the drama; their identity was kept under a press embargo. Actress Laila Rouass confirmed that she had reprised her role as cardiothoracic consultant Sahira Shah in January 2021. Returning in episode 37, Sahira replaces Jac on Darwin ward as the clinical lead.

Tyler Luke Cunningham joined the cast as Louis McGerry, the son of Max, in episode 12. Louis, like Cunningham, is transgender and his introduction coincided with Trans Day of Visibility. Initially appearing in a recurring role, Cunningham joined the show's regular cast in episode 15 as Louis begins employment at the hospital as a staff nurse. Following the show's production break, four new regular characters were introduced to the series: psychiatric nurse Lucky Simpson (Vineeta Rishi), and F1 doctors: Josh Hudson (Trieve Blackwood-Cambridge), Jeong-Soo Han (Chan Woo Lim), and Skylar Bryce (Phoebe Pryce). Josh, Jeong-Soo and Skylar were introduced in episode 26, while Lucky appears from episode 28. Skylar departs the show in episode 34 after trying to kill herself. Actress Amy Murphy was introduced in episode 37 as "warm, vibrant and charming" nurse Kylie Madden. Murphy's agency confirmed that she had joined the show's regular cast.

The series features several recurring characters, and numerous guest stars. Wallbank confirmed in an August 2019 interview that two cast members from Holby City sister show Casualty: Jason Durr (David Hide) and Shaheen Jafargholi (Marty Kirkby) would appear during this series for guest appearances. Marty appears in a story with his cousin, Kian, and David appears in a story about nursing. Jafargholi's appearance features in episode two. Durr filmed his appearances in December 2019, and he appears in episodes 12 and 13. Nicky features prominently in the series as part of a "big, gritty, topical" story exploring her personal struggles. As part of the story, actress Cathy Murphy was cast to portray Nicky's mother, Tracey McKendrick, in a recurring capacity from episode 3. She continues to appear in the series until episode 21 when Nicky disowns her. Tracey's blackmailer, Steve Connor (John Wark), was also introduced for the beginning of the story, appearing in two episodes. Towards the end of Murphy's guest stint, Lynn Hunter was cast to portray Tracey's friend, Brenda Connolly. She appears in three episodes culminating in her character's death.

Susan Engel reprised her guest role as Sacha's great aunt, Maria Edelman, in episode 4, having last appeared in series 19. She appears in the Holocaust Memorial Day episode. Following this, David Horovitch reprised his role as Rabbi Stein, the rabbi at Sacha's synagogue, having also previously appeared in a series 19 episode. Horovitch appeared again in the twenty-fifth episode for Sacha and Essie's wedding. As part of a story about Kian, Phoenix Bates (Joshua Glenister), the son of Kian's dead girlfriend, Bea Kaminski (Rosalind Halstead), was introduced. He appears in episodes 17 and 22. Episode 18 features the appearance of Fletch's daughter, Evie Fletcher, who is now portrayed by Phoebe French. Macey Chipping previously played the character across four series. Having previously appeared in the last series, Sophie Harkness reprised her role as Frankie Rendell in episode 23 as part of Essie's terminal cancer story. John Barrowman was cast in a one-episode guest role as Drew Nicholson-Heath, a consultant and "renowned global recruiter" who shares a backstory with Ange. Barrowman expressed his delight at appearing in the drama and commented, "My character Drew brings a new flavour to the show and I look forward to his return soon. Surgery will never be the same again." Drew appears in episode 23 and Barrowman suggested that the character could appear in future episodes. 

The casting of actress Sian Reese-Williams in the recurring guest role of Jodie Rodgers was announced in October 2020. Jodie is a love interest for Sacha and features in a story about Sacha's grief for Essie. Reese-Williams expressed her excitement about the role and said that she was surprised to be offered a job during the pandemic. It was also confirmed that the chairman of the board, Michael Townsend (Elliot Levey), would appear, and he debuted in episode 27. Amanda Mealing, who portrays Connie Beauchamp in Casualty and formerly in Holby City, told Elaine Reilly of What's on TV that she would make a crossover appearance in the series to "visit the old gang again".

Main characters 
 David Ames as Dominic Copeland
 Bob Barrett as Sacha Levy
 Trieve Blackwood-Cambridge as Josh Hudson
 Tyler Luke Cunningham as Louis McGerry
 Marcus Griffiths as Xavier "Zav" Duval
 Guy Henry as Henrik Hanssen
 Nic Jackman as Cameron Dunn
 Jaye Jacobs as Donna Jackson
 Ramin Karimloo as Kian Madani
 Amy Lennox as Chloe Godard
 Rosie Marcel as Jac Naylor
 Jo Martin as Max McGerry
 Miles Mitchell as Alex Duval
 Amy Murphy as Kylie Madden
 Belinda Owusu as Nicky McKendrick
 Phoebe Pryce as Skylar Bryce
 Hugh Quarshie as Ric Griffin
 Vineeta Rishi as Lucky Simpson
 
 Dawn Steele as Ange Godard
 Alex Walkinshaw as Adrian "Fletch" Fletcher
 Chan Woo Lim as Jeong-Soo Han
 Kaye Wragg as Essie Di Lucca

Recurring characters 
 Darcey Burke as Emma Naylor-Maconie
 Charlie Condou as Ben Sherwood
 Julia Deakin as Carole Copeland
 Phoebe French as Evie Fletcher
 Elliot Levey as Michael Townsend
 John Michie as Guy Self
 Cathy Murphy as Tracey McKendrick
 Sian Reese-Williams as Jodie Rodgers
 Jules Robertson as Jason Haynes
 Laila Rouass as Sahira Shah

Guest characters 
 John Barrowman as Drew Nicholson-Heath
 Jason Durr as David Hide
 Susan Engel as Maria Edelman
 Joshua Glenister as Phoenix Bates
 Sophie Harkness as Frankie Rendell
 David Horovitch as Rabbi Stein
 Lynn Hunter as Brenda Connolly
 Shaheen Jafargholi as Marty Kirkby
 Joe McFadden as Raf di Lucca
 John Wark as Steve Connor

See also 
Impact of the COVID-19 pandemic on television

Notes

References 
General

 Final viewing figures: 

Specific

External links 
 Holby City at BBC Online
 Holby City at the Internet Movie Database

22
2020 British television seasons
2021 British television seasons
Television productions suspended due to the COVID-19 pandemic